The 2019–20 season was the 115th season of competitive football in Turkey.

Pre-season

League tables

Süper Lig

1.Lig

Turkish Cup

Final

National team

UEFA Euro 2020 qualification

Turkish clubs in Europe

UEFA Champions League

Third qualifying round

Group stage

Group A

UEFA Europa League

Second qualifying round

Third qualifying round

Play-off round

Group stage

Group C

Group J

Group K

Knockout phase

Round of 32

Round of 16

References

 
Seasons in Turkish football
Turkish 2019